The 2017–18 FC Lokomotiv Moscow season was the club's 26th season in the Russian Premier League, the highest tier of the Russian football league system. Lokomotiv Moscow also took part in the Russian Cup and also the Europa League. Lokomotiv also contested the Russian Super Cup. Lokomotiv's farm club was relaunched as Kazanka and participated in the Russian Professional Football League, the third highest division in the Russian football league system.

Main Events

 Ilya Herkus announced the foundation of Lokomotiv-Kazanka. Lokomotiv-Kazanka, which will act as Lokomotiv's farm club, will participate in the Russian Professional Football League, the third level of Russian football. Lokomotiv-Kazanka will be formed on the current youth team and will play their home matches at Sapsan Arena under the tutelage of Denis Klyuyev. Lokomotiv-Kazanka was officially launched as Kazanka on 5 July 2017. 
 On 5 August 2017, Lokomotiv announced that the stadium has been renamed to RZD Arena.

First Team Squad

Information

Players and squad numbers last updated on 5 May 2018.Note: Flags indicate national team as has been defined under FIFA eligibility rules. Players may hold more than one non-FIFA nationality.

Transfers

Arrivals

Departures

Friendlies

Pre-season

Mid-season

Competitions

Overview

Russian Super Cup

Russian Premier League

League table

Results by round

Matches

Russian Cup

Europa League

Lokomotiv have qualified directly for the group stage of the 2017–18 UEFA Europa League after winning the 2017 Russian Cup Final.

Group stage

Knockout phase

Round of 32

Round of 16

Statistics

Squad statistics

|}

Goals record

References

FC Lokomotiv Moscow seasons
Lokomotiv Moscow
Lokomotiv Moscow
Russian football championship-winning seasons